Cybook Orizon is a 6-inch e-Reader, specially designed for reading e-Books. It is produced by the French company Bookeen.

See also
 Comparison of e-book readers
 Comparison of tablet computers

References

Dedicated ebook devices